In Greek mythology, Patroclus, Greek Patroklos, was Achilles’ best friend and, according to some, his lover. Due to the wide fame of Homer's work, it was used as a male first name throughout the Hellenistic and Roman periods. 

Patroclus may also refer to:

People
 Patroclus (admiral), a Macedonian admiral in the service of Ptolemy II of Egypt, 3rd century BC
 Patroclus of Bourges, 5th-century Christian saint
 Patroclus of Troyes, 3rd-century Christian saint
 Patroclus, a bishop of the Ancient Diocese of Arles
 Patroclus, son of Heracles by Pyrippe, a daughter of Thespius
 Patroklos Karantinos, Greek architect

Places
 Patroklos, Attica, a private island near Attica, Greece, named after the 3rd c. admiral
 St. Patrokli, Soest, Germany
 Patroclus Hill, a hill on Anvers Island

Scientific
 617 Patroclus, an asteroid
 Lyssa patroclus, a species of moth in the family Uraniidae

Other uses
 Several ships named 
 Patroklos, a character from the Soul Calibur video game series

See also
Saint Patroclus (disambiguation)